The Standardised Precipitation-Evapotranspiration Index (SPEI) is a multiscalar drought index based on climatic data. It can be used for determining the onset, duration and magnitude of drought conditions with respect to normal conditions in a variety of natural and managed systems such as crops, ecosystems, rivers, water resources, etc.

References

External links 
 SPEI world database, updated monthly
 R package that calculates the SPEI

Meteorological indices
Droughts
Hydrology